Anthropologischer Anzeiger: Journal of Biological and Clinical Anthropology is a quarterly peer-reviewed scientific journal covering biological and medical anthropology. It was established in 1924 by Rudolf Martin. It is published by E. Schweizerbart and the editors-in-chief are Frank J. Rühli (University of Zurich), Michael Hermanussen, and Albert Zink (Institute for Mummies and the Iceman). According to the Journal Citation Reports, the journal has a 2017 impact factor of 0.866.

References

External links

Publications established in 1924
Quarterly journals
Anthropology journals
E. Schweizerbart academic journals